Hexanone may refer to the following ketones containing six carbon atoms:
 2-Hexanone (Methyl butyl ketone, MBK)
 4-Methyl-2-pentanone (Methyl isobutyl ketone, MIBK)
 3-Methyl-2-pentanone (Methyl sec-butyl ketone)
 3,3-Dimethyl-2-butanone (Methyl tert-butyl ketone, Pinacolone)
 3-Hexanone (Ethyl propyl ketone)
 2-Methyl-3-pentanone (Ethyl isopropyl ketone)

See also
 Cyclohexanone

Hexanones